Takuzō, Takuzo or Takuzou (written: 卓三 or 拓三) is a masculine Japanese given name. Notable people with the name include:

 (born 1956), Japanese scientist
 (1941–1995), Japanese actor

Japanese masculine given names